Heather Currie MBE is an associate specialist gynaecologist. Her work relates specifically to menopause and she is the founder of Menopause Matters, a web resource providing to the public up-to-date, accurate information about the health at the menopause, menopause at work  menopausal symptoms and treatment options.

Career
Currie works at NHS Dumfries and Galloway. She is the Scottish National Clinical Lead for modernizing gynaecology outpatients.

She is the managing director of Menopause Matters and a Trustee of the British Menopause Society.

The British Menopause Society (BMS)  is a specialist society associated with the Royal College of Obstetricians and Gynaecologists. It was established in 1989 to educate and guide Healthcare professionals on menopause and all aspects of post reproductive health. Currie is co-editor of their quarterly journal Post Reproductive Health and was  Chair of the Society in 2016-2017. Her research supports ensuring that all healthcare professionals have a basic understanding of the menopause and know where to signpost women for advice, support and treatment whenever appropriate.

Currie has written several books and papers including Menopause: Essentials: Expert And Practical Advice; Your Most Vital Questions Answered and a Web-based survey on the effect of menopause on women's libido in a computer-literate population. She encourages women to consult healthcare professionals about their symptoms, particularly when those are having a significant effect on work life, social life, home life and sex life.

Currie was appointed an Member of the Order of the British Empire (MBE) for services to Healthcare in the 2021 Birthday Honours.

See also 
 Menopause in the workplace
 Menopause

References 

Women's health in the United Kingdom
Year of birth missing (living people)
Living people
British gynaecologists
Women gynaecologists